Granulina marginata is a species of very small sea snail, a marine gastropod mollusk or micromollusk in the family Granulinidae.

Description
The length of the shell attains 1.9 mm.

Distribution
This species occurs in the Mediterranean Sea off Sicily.

References

 Boyer F., Renda W. & Öztürk B. (2020). The genus Granulina (Mollusca: Gastropoda: Neogastropoda) from the Turkish coasts with taxonomical notes on some Mediterranean species. Ege Journal of Fisheries and Aquatic Sciences. 37(1): 65–83.

External links
 Bivona-Bernardi Ant. (1832). Caratteri di alcune nuove specie di conchiglie. Effemeride Scientifiche e Letterarie per la Sicilia. 2: 16-24, pls 2-3
 Scacchi A. (1833). Osservazioni Zoologiche. Napoli, Tipi della Società Tipografica. 1: 1-12
 allary, P. (1900). Coquilles marines du littoral du département d'Oran. Journal de Conchyliologie. 48(3): 211-422
 Gofas S. (1992) Le genre Granulina (Marginellidae) en Méditerranée et dans l'Atlantique oriental. Bollettino Malacologico 28(1-4): 1-26

Granulinidae
Gastropods described in 1832